This is a list of experiments at CERN's Large Hadron Collider (LHC). The LHC is the most energetic particle collider in the world, and is used to test the accuracy of the Standard Model, and to look for physics beyond the Standard Model such as supersymmetry, extra dimensions, and others.

The list is first compiled from the SPIRES database, then missing information is retrieved from the online version CERN's Grey Book. The most specific information of the two is kept, e.g. if the SPIRES database lists December 2008, while the Grey Book lists 22 December 2008, the Grey Book entry is shown. When there is a conflict between the SPIRES database and the Grey Book, the SPIRES database information is listed, unless otherwise noted.

Large Hadron Collider experiments

MilliQan, MATHUSLA, FASER, LHCf, MOEDAL and TOTEM are much smaller than the other four experiments. Each is close to one of the larger experiments and uses the same collision point.

Notes 
1. Only a prototype has been approved and constructed so far, much smaller than the full proposed detector

See also
Experiments
List of CERN experiments
List of Super Proton Synchrotron experiments
List of Proton Synchrotron experiments

Facilities
CERN: European Organization for Nuclear Research
PS: Proton Synchrotron
SPS: Super Proton Synchrotron
ISOLDE: On-Line Isotope Mass Separator
ISR: Intersecting Storage Rings
LEP: Large Electron–Positron Collider
LHC: Large Hadron Collider
AD: Antiproton Decelerator

References

External links
CERN website
LHC website
CERN Grey Book
SPIRES database

experiments
Particle experiments
LHC